Syed Waheed Akhtar (12 August 1934, in Aurangabad (Deccan) – 13 December 1996) was an Urdu poet, writer, critic, orator, and a Muslim scholar and philosopher.

Works 

According to Shamsur Rahman Faruqi, "Wahid Akhtar, regarded by many as a Modernist and by many others as Progressive, wrote that Modernism was really an extension of Progressivism". Akhtar is also considered by at least one writer to be among the few successful modern Urdu poets who took Marsia to new heights and gave it new direction in this age.

See also 

 Urdu poetry
 Mir Babar Ali Anis

References

External links 
 Reliving Karbala Martyrdom in South Asian Memory By Syed Akbar Hyder, Inc NetLibrary

1934 births
1996 deaths
Writers from Hyderabad, India
Urdu-language poets from India
20th-century Muslim scholars of Islam
Shia scholars of Islam
People from Aligarh
Academic staff of Aligarh Muslim University
Indian Shia Muslims
Islamic philosophers
People from Aurangabad, Maharashtra
20th-century Indian poets
People from Marathwada
Indian Muslim scholars of Islam
Indian male poets
Poets from Maharashtra
20th-century Indian male writers